Parliamentary elections were held in Cameroon on 9 February 2020, together with municipal elections. The Cameroon People's Democratic Movement retained its majority in parliament, winning 139 of the 167 seats decided on election day.

Background
The elections had originally been scheduled for 2018. However, in June 2018 President Paul Biya sent a letter to leader of the Senate seeking to delay the elections until October 2019. On 2 July 2019 parliament voted to extend its mandate by twelve months. Ahead of that date the following June, documents leaked on social media purporting to show Biya's negotiations with parliamentary leaders to further delay parliamentary elections to coincide with municipal elections in February 2020. The ongoing Anglophone Crisis dominated the process, with supporters of Ambazonia calling for a boycott of the election. Ensuing violence resulted in a low turnout in the Northwest Region and Southwest Region, with separatists claiming that 98 percent of eligible voters had boycotted the election.

Electoral system
The 180 members of the National Assembly are elected from 58 single- and multi-member constituencies based on the departments. In single-member constituencies, first-past-the-post voting is used. In multi-member constituencies, a modified form of closed list proportional representation is used, in which a party receiving over 50% of the vote in a constituency wins all the seats, but if no party receives over 50% of the vote, the party with the most votes is awarded half the seats and any other party receiving over 5% of the vote receives a proportional share of the remaining half of the seats based on the largest remainder method and Hare quota.

Results

References

Cameroon
Parliamentary election
Elections in Cameroon
Election and referendum articles with incomplete results